Zombo District is a district in the Northern Region of Uganda. The town of Zombo is the district's main municipal, administrative, and commercial center,

Location
Zombo District is bordered by Arua District to the north, Nebbi District to the east, and the Democratic Republic of the Congo to the south and west. The coordinates of the district are 02 30N, 30 54E.

Ethnicities
The Alur people ethnic group comprise over 90% of the population.

Overview
The district was created by Act of Parliament and became functional on 1 July 2009. Prior to then, the district was part of the Nebbi District.

Population
In 1991, the national population census estimated the district population at 131,300. In 2002, the national census estimated the population at 169,000. In 2012, the population was estimated at 219,800.

See also
 Paidha
 West Nile sub-region
 Districts of Uganda

References

External links
  Zombo District Information Portal

 
West Nile sub-region
Districts of Uganda
Northern Region, Uganda